Sidney Pullen (14 July 1895 – 1950s) was an English football Midfielder, who played for Flamengo, a club based in Rio de Janeiro.

Biography
Born in Southampton, Sidney migrated to Brazil after his father, Hugh Pullen, was transferred to a factory in Rio de Janeiro. When Paysandu closed their football department, he moved to Flamengo, and his father imported from Germany the kit known as coral snake. During World War I, he left Flamengo to fight for England. Sidney Pullen died in the 1950s, in Rio de Janeiro.

Career
He started his career in 1910, defending Paysandu, a Rio de Janeiro team founded by English expatriates, winning the Campeonato Carioca in 1912, then, after the club closed their football department in 1914, he moved to Flamengo in 1915, where he played 116 matches and scored 40 goals, winning the Campeonato Carioca five times before leaving the club in 1925. He has also worked as Flamengo's head coach.

Brazil national team
Sidney Pullen was the first of only five foreigners to play for the Brazil national team. He played five matches between 1916 and 1917, thereof three 1916 Copa América matches in July 1916. In 1917 he played for Brazil in two test matches against the club sides Dublin FC from Montevideo and Sportivo Barracas from Buenos Aires.

Refereeing career
He worked as a referee in one match of the 1916 Copa América. The match was played on 6 July, between Argentina and Chile.

References
 Marcelo Leme de Arruda, André do Nascimento Pereira: Seleção Brasileira (Brazilian National Team) 1914-1922, Rec.Sport.Soccer Statistics Foundation and RSSSF Brazil, 15 February 2014.

Notes:

1895 births
1950s deaths
Brazilian footballers
English footballers
English football managers
Brazilian football managers
English football referees
Brazilian football referees
English expatriate footballers
CR Flamengo footballers
Expatriate footballers in Brazil
Brazil international footballers
Footballers from Southampton
British emigrants to Brazil
Fluminense FC players
Association football midfielders
British military personnel of World War I